Ralph Di Stasio (born December 5, 1976), better known by his stage name Avery Storm, is an American singer.

Di Stasio grew up in a working-class Italian-American family in New Jersey. After high school, he moved to New York City and signed to Timbaland's record label Beat Club in 2001 as "Avery Storm" after joining an independent production company.

In 2005, Di Stasio was signed to the record label Derrty Entertainment, owned by rapper Nelly. Storm previously performed on Nelly's album Suit in 2004. Storm appeared on the charting hip hop singles "Nasty Girl", a posthumous single of The Notorious B.I.G. that included Nelly, P. Diddy, and Jagged Edge, and "Here I Am" by Rick Ross, another single that featured Nelly. Shotgun Love is the title of Storm's upcoming debut album, for which Storm has recorded 300 tracks., while Audiobiography is the title of Avery's EP produced by the Italian team The Ceasars in 2014.

Discography

Albums
TBA: Shotgun Love

Mixtapes
2006: Volume Whatever
2009: Category 5
2010: Diary of the TakeOff (in collaboration with The HeatMakerz)

EPs
2014: Audiobiography (produced by The Ceasars (featuring Jadakiss, Styles P))

Singles
2007: "Stop Time"
2008: "Terrified" (featuring Jadakiss)
2008: "My Life" (featuring City Spud)
2009: "Not Like My Girl" (featuring Rick Ross)
2010: "Supermodel" (featuring Nelly)

Featured singles

Guest appearances

References

Living people
American male singer-songwriters
American people of Italian descent
People from New Jersey
Singers from New York City
American contemporary R&B singers
American hip hop singers
1981 births
21st-century American singers
21st-century American male singers
Singer-songwriters from New York (state)